

Achiroë(Ancient Greek: Ἀχιρόη) , Anchirrhoë (Ἀγχιρρόη), or Anchinoë (Ἀγχινόη), which is perhaps a mistake for Anchiroë, was in Greek mythology a naiad, a daughter of the river-god Nilus. She was also the wife of Belus, by whom she became the mother of Aegyptus and Danaus, and, according to some accounts, Cepheus, and Phineus. Otherwise, the possible mother of this children and spouse of Belus was called Side, eponym of Sidon in Phoenicia.

Mythology
Anchinoe was a minor figure in Greek accounts and only mentioned by Apollodorus in his Bibliotheca:

 But Belus remained in Egypt, reigned over the country, and married Anchinoe, daughter of Nile, by whom he had twin sons, Egyptus and Danaus, but according to Euripides, he had also Cepheus and Phineus.

Argive genealogy

Notes

References 
 Apollodorus, The Library with an English Translation by Sir James George Frazer, F.B.A., F.R.S. in 2 Volumes, Cambridge, MA, Harvard University Press; London, William Heinemann Ltd. 1921. ISBN 0-674-99135-4. Online version at the Perseus Digital Library. Greek text available from the same website.
 Bell, Robert E., Women of Classical Mythology: A Biographical Dictionary. ABC-Clio. 1991. .

Naiads
Egyptian characters in Greek mythology